Guy Dennis Spelman (born 18 October 1958) is a former English cricketer. Spelman was a left-handed batsman who bowled right-arm medium pace. He was born at Westminster in London.

Spelman made his debut for Kent County Cricket Club in a List A match against Yorkshire in the 1978 John Player League. He played List A cricket for Kent until 1980, making six appearances, the last of which came against Middlesex in the 1980 John Player League. Spelman, whose main role was a bowler, took 7 wickets in his six List A matches, which came at an average of 27.71, with best figures of 3/30. It wasn't until 1980 that Spelman made his first-class debut for the county against Sussex in the County Championship. He made six further first-class appearances for Kent, the last of which came against Oxford University in 1982. In his seven first-class appearances, he took 10 wickets at an average of 35.70, with best figures of 2/27.

References

External links

1958 births
Living people
People from Westminster
English cricketers
Kent cricketers